Aechmea longifolia is a species of flowering plant in the genus Aechmea. This species is native to Bolivia, Venezuela, Colombia, the Guianas, northern Brazil, Peru and Ecuador.

References

longifolia
Flora of South America
Plants described in 1805